Ma Jing (born 2 January 1988) is a Chinese Paralympic athlete and para cross-country skier.

Career
Ma represented China at the 2016 Summer Paralympics and finished in sixth place in the 400 metres, and 5000 metres, and seventh place in the 1500 metres T54 events.

She represented China at the 2022 Winter Paralympics and won a bronze medal in the 7.5 kilometre sitting event.

References 

Living people
1988 births
People from Shangluo
Athletes (track and field) at the 2016 Summer Paralympics
Cross-country skiers at the 2022 Winter Paralympics
Medalists at the 2022 Winter Paralympics
Paralympic bronze medalists for China
Paralympic medalists in cross-country skiing